Srirangam Srinivasa Rao (30 April 1910 – 15 June 1983), popularly known as Sri Sri, was an Indian poet and lyricist who is known for his works in Telugu literature and films. Noted for his anthology Maha Prasthanam, Sri Sri is a recipient of a National Film Award, a Nandi Award and a Sahitya Akademi Award.

He was a member of Pen India, Sahitya Academy, vice-president of the South Indian Film Writers Association, Madras and president of the Revolutionary Writers Association of Andhra.

Life
Srirangam Srinivasa Rao, popularly known as Sri Sri, was born in a Telugu Brahmin family on 30 April 1910 in Visakhapatnam of present-day Andhra Pradesh. His parents were Pudipeddi Venkatramaniah and Atappakonda but was later adopted by Srirangam Suryanarayana. Sri Sri was schooled at Vishakhapatnam and graduated in BA hons at Madras christian college in 1931. He started as a demonstrator at SVS College, Vizag in 1935 and joined as sub-editor at the daily, Andhra Prabha in 1938. He later worked at Delhi Akashavani, The State of Hyderabad, and the daily Andhra Vani, in various positions.

He later married Sarojini, with whom he had a son and three daughters, whose names were Mala Srinivasarao, Venkat Srinivasarao, Manjula Srinivasarao, Mangala Srinivasarao.

Literary career

Srirangam Srinivasa Rao was the first true modern Telugu poet to write about contemporary issues that affected the day-to-day life of a common man in a style and metre which were not used in classical Telugu poetry. He moved poetry forward from traditional mythological themes to reflect more contemporary issues. The essence of his personality was captured by Gudipati Venkatachalam when he compared him with the great romantic Telugu poet Devulapalli Krishnasastri: “While Krishna Sastry made his anguish known to the whole world,  Sri Sri spoke in his voice about the anguish of the whole world. Krishna Sastry's pain was the pain of the world, while the world's pain became Sri Sri's pain.”
His book Maha Prasthanam (The Great Journey), an anthology of poems, is one of his major works. In one of the poems, "Jagannathuni Ratha Chakralu", Sri Sri addressed those who were suffering due to social injustices and said, "Don't cry, don't cry. The wheels of the chariot of Jagannath are coming; they are coming! The apocalyptic chant of the chariot wheels! Come, realize your dreams Rule your new world!" "Other major works include Siprali and Khadga Srushti ("Creation of the Sword").

Telugu cinema
He entered into Telugu cinema with Ahuti (1950), a Telugu-dubbed version of Junnarkar's Neera aur Nanda (1946). Some of the songs, such as "Hamsavale O Padava", "Oogisaladenayya", "Premaye jannana marana leela", scored by Saluri Rajeswara Rao, were major hits. Sri Sri was a screenwriter for several Telugu films. He was one of the best film songwriters in India, he has penned lyrics for over 1000 soundtracks in Telugu. He was a great asset to the Telugu film industry.

Literary style 
He is a major radical poet (e.g. Prabhava) and novelist (e.g. Veerasimha Vijayasimhulu). He introduced free verse into his socially concerned poetry through Maha Prasthanam. He wrote visionary poems in a style and metre not used before in Telugu classical poetry.

According to Viplava Rachayitala Sangham leader G. Kalyan Rao, Sri Sri was a scientist, a thinker and a philosopher. Maoist ideologue and writer Varavara Rao opined that Sri Sri not only wrote poetry but also practiced what he said.

Work for human rights
Sri Sri was the first President of Andhra Pradesh Civil Liberties Committee that was formed in 1974.

Awards and recognitions

National honours
Sahithya Academy Award – 1972
Soviet Land Nehru Award

Film awards 
National Film Award for Best Lyrics –  Alluri Seetarama Raju for "Telugu Veera Levara" – 1974
Nandi Award for Best Lyricist – Neti Bharatam – "Ardha Raatri Swatantram Andhakara Bandhuram" – 1983

Other honours
Raja-Lakshmi Award in 1979 by Sri Raja-Lakshmi Foundation in Chennai

Bibliography

 Prabhava (1928)
 Vaaram Vaaram (1946)
 Sampangi Thota (1947)
 Maha Prasthanam (1950)
 Amma (1952)
 Meemee (1954)
 Maro Prapancham (1956)
 Three Cheers for Man (1956)
 Charama Raathri (1957)
 Maanavudi Paatlu (1958)
 Sowdamini
 Gurajada (1959)
 Moodu Yebhailu (1964)
 Khadga Srushti (1966)
 Views and Reviews (1969)
 Sri Sri Sahityam (5 volumes) (1970)
 Sri Sri's Minnelani (1970)
 Rekka Vippina Revolution (1971)
 Vyasa Kreedalu (1973)
 Maro Moodu Yabhailu (1974)
 China Yaanam (1980)
 Maro Prasthanam (1980)
 Mahaa Prasthanam (1981)
 Paadavoyi Bharateeyuda (1983)
 New Frontiers (1983)
 Anantam
 Pra-Ja

Filmography

References

External links

1910 births
1983 deaths
Indian lyricists
Indian atheists
Telugu-language lyricists
Telugu poets
Recipients of the Sahitya Akademi Award in Telugu
20th-century Indian poets
University of Madras alumni
Indian Marxists
Writers from Visakhapatnam
Indian male poets
Indian Marxist writers
Poets from Andhra Pradesh
Best Lyrics National Film Award winners
People from Visakhapatnam
 People from Uttarandhra